Crocosmia aurea, common names falling stars, Valentine flower, or montbretia, is a perennial  flowering plant belonging to the family Iridaceae.

Etymology
The genus name is derived from the Greek words krokos, meaning "saffron", and osme, 
meaning "odor", as dried leaves of these plants, when immersed in hot water, emit a strong smell similar to saffron. The species Latin name aurea, meaning “golden”, refers to the bright colour of the flowers.

Description
Crocosmia aurea reaches on average  in height. It grows from basal underground corms with long stolons. At the end of the flower stalk they have colourful branched inflorescences of bright orange to red flowers, reaching on average  in diameter. The flowering period extends from June through August. The fruit is a capsule, with small blackish and round seeds. The plant can also be propagated by dividing the clumps of corms, fleshy underground stems similar to bulbs.

Distribution
Crocosmia aurea is widely distributed in southern and eastern Africa, from South Africa to Sudan. In South Africa it is common in the grasslands of the Cape Floristic Region.

Habitat
Usually these plants live in large colonies in shady forests and in banks of the rivers.

Gallery

References

External links
 Biolib
 Plants for a Future

Iridaceae
Flora of Africa
Plants described in 1847